William Musters Chaworth Musters (1 January 1810 – 16 October 1870) was an English cricketer who was associated with Oxford University Cricket Club and made his first-class debut in 1829. He also played for Nottinghamshire.

Musters was educated at Corpus Christi College, Oxford. He became a Church of England priest and was rector of Colwick Old Church 1834–60.

References

1810 births
1870 deaths
English cricketers
English cricketers of 1826 to 1863
Oxford University cricketers
Nottinghamshire cricketers
Nottingham Cricket Club cricketers
North v South cricketers
Gentlemen of Nottinghamshire cricketers
Alumni of Corpus Christi College, Oxford
19th-century English Anglican priests
People from Colwick
Cricketers from Nottinghamshire